Surkhavkent (Kaitag: Сурхавккент; Dargwa: ЦӀурхавкент) is a rural locality (a selo) in Varsitsky Selsoviet, Kaytagsky District, Republic of Dagestan, Russia. The population was 40 as of 2010.

Geography 
Surkhavkent is located 25 km south of Madzhalis (the district's administrative centre) by road. Varsit and Shuragat are the nearest rural localities.

Nationalities 
Dargins live there.

References 

Rural localities in Kaytagsky District